USS LST-357 was an  of the United States Navy active during the Second World War. Whilst never formally named, she was nicknamed Palermo Pete by her crew.

Service history 
She was laid down in October 1942 at the Charleston Navy Yard, and commissioned in February 1943.

LST-357 first saw action at the invasion of Sicily in July 1943. During the Salerno landings on September 9, a crew of just under 150 all ranks took some 90 casualties. One crew member, Warren C. Gill, was awarded the Navy Cross for his actions, making him one of just six Coast Guardsmen to be awarded the Navy Cross during World War II.

In 1944 she moved to England for the Normandy landings, landing on Omaha Beach on D-Day.

Following the end of the war, she served on occupation duties in the Far East, before being decommissioned in June 1946 and sold for scrapping in April 1948.

Notes

References
 
 

World War II amphibious warfare vessels of the United States
Ships built in Charleston, South Carolina
1942 ships
LST-1-class tank landing ships of the United States Navy